The 2014 season was Breiðablik's 29th season in Úrvalsdeild and their 9th consecutive season in top-flight of Icelandic Football.

After 8 years as head coach of Breiðablik Ólafur Kristjánsson signed as manager of FC Nordsjælland on 2 July, he left the club after the Stjarnan game on 2 June. He was replaced by his assistant coach Guðmundur Benediktsson 6 league games into the season.

On 25 April Breiðablik finished 2nd in Lengjubikarinn, losing the final 4–1 to FH.

Despite their good pre-season and finishing 2nd in Lengjubikarinn Breiðablik struggled in the league and went 9 league games without a victory. Their first league victory came on 2 July against Þór. Breiðablik finished the season in 7th place, their lowest finish since 2008, with 12 draws in 22 games.

Breiðablik were eliminated in the quarter finals of Borgunarbikarinn on 6 July to eventual winners KR after beating HK and Þór in the 32nd-finals and 16th-finals.

On 13 October former Breiðablik's player Arnar Grétarsson was confirmed as the new head coach of Breiðablik following the departure of Guðmundur Benediktsson.

First team

Transfers in

Transfers out

Loans In

Loans Out

Pre-season

Fótbolti.net Cup
Breiðablik took part in Fótbolti.net Cup, a pre-season tournament for clubs outside of Reykjavík, in January. The team played in Group 1 with FH, Keflavík and Grindavík. 
Breiðablik played 4 games, won 2 and lost 2. The team won ÍBV in the game for 5th place.

Atlantic Cup
Breiðablik took part, for the first time, in The Atlantic Cup held in Algarve, Portugal, a pre-season friendly tournament contested of 8 teams from 6 countries. The team played 3 games, 1 win 1 draw 1 loss, against SV Mattersburg, FC Midtjylland and F.C. Copenhagen and finished in 5th place. FH were the other Icelandic team in the tournament.

Lengjubikarinn
Lengjubikarinn, the Icelandic league cup, was held from 14 February to 25 April. It was played in 3 groups and Breiðablik were drawn in Group 1 along with 7 other teams. Breiðablik finished in 2nd place in the group and went on to play in the quarter-finals where they beat Víkingur. In the semi-finals they beat Þór but lost in the finals to FH thus getting the silver.

Matches

Úrvalsdeild
Breiðablik started the season on 5 May with a game against FH. The game ended with a 1–1 draw and from their Breiðablik started too struggle. They only took 6 points from their first 9 games, 6 draws and 3 defeats. Ólafur Kristjánsson's last game in charge was against Stjarnan on 2 June, game that ended with a 1–1 draw and Ólafur left Breiðablik without a league win in 2014 season. Their first win came on 2 July against Þór, that was Guðmundur Benediktsson first league win as head coach of Breiðablik. After collecting 12 points in the first half of the season from 11 games (2 wins, 6 draws, 3 defeats), the team improved slightly in the second half off the season and only lost 2 games of the last 13, but too many draws, 12 in total, left the team only securing safety in the 20th round. Breiðablik finished the season in 7th place only 3 points shy of 4th place which gave Europa League Qualification after KR's win in Borgunarbikarinn.

Table

Matches

Summary of results

Points breakdown
 Points at home: 17
 Points away from home: 10
 6 Points: Valur
 4 Points: Fram
 3 Points: Víkingur, Þór
 2 Points: Fjölnir, Stjarnan, Fylkir, ÍBV
 1 Points: FH, KR, Keflavík

Borgunarbikar
Breiðablik entered the Borgunarbikarinn in the 3rd round (32nd finals) with the other teams from Úrvalsdeild where they were drawn against local rivals HK. Breiðablik won the game 2–1 and the win was their first win of the 2014 summer season. In the 4th round (16th finals) Breiðablik defeated Þór 3–1 after extra time. Breiðablik then lost in the 5th round 2–0 to eventual winners KR in a disappointing game.

Matches

Squad information

Players' statistics

Appearances (Apps.) numbers are for appearances in competitive games only(Úrvalsdeild, Borgunarbikar and Lengjubikar). Right side of + are sub appearances
Red card numbers denote:   Numbers in parentheses represent red cards overturned for wrongful dismissal.

References

External links
 Breiðablik Official Site
 Blikar.is – Breiðablik Fan Site

Breiðablik UBK seasons
Breidablik